Shwe Zin Gon (also known as Min Shwe Gon) was the chief queen of King Bayin Htwe of Prome (r. 1527–1532). She was of Ava royalty, and a daughter of Mingyi Swa, viceroy of Prome (r. 1446–1482). In 1482, her paternal uncle Thado Minsaw took over Prome, and declared himself king. Thado Minsaw raised her mother Saw Myat Lay to chief queen. Shwe Zin Gon herself was later married to her first cousin Bayin Htwe, the eldest son of Thado Minsaw. Her eldest son Narapati was king of Prome from 1532 to 1539.

Ancestry
She was the youngest of the 11 children of Viceroy Mingyi Swa of Prome and Saw Myat Lay. The following is her ancestry as reported in the Hmannan Yazawin chronicle, which in turn referenced contemporary inscriptions. Her parents were first cousins.

Notes

References

Bibliography
 
 

Ava dynasty
Prome dynasty
16th-century Burmese women
15th-century Burmese women